Victoria Kreuzer (born January 2, 1989) from Fiesch is a Swiss ski mountaineer and mountain runner.

Selected results

Ski mountaineering 
 2010:
 10th (and 2nd espoirs), World Championship, vertical race
 4th (espoirs), World Championship, individual
 1st, Zermatt-Rothorn run
 7th (and 1st in the espoirs ranking), Trophée des Gastlosen (ISMF World Cup), together with Mireille Richard
 2011:
 2nd (espoirs), World Championship, vertical race
 9th (espoirs), World Championship, sprint
 2012:
 1st, Zermatt-Rothorn run

Running 
 2006:
 3rd (juniors), Greifenseelauf, 21.1 km
 2007:
 1st (juniors), Matterhorn run
 1st (juniors), Jeizibärg-Lauf / Valais Mountain Running Cup, Gampel
 2008:
 1st (juniors), Matterhorn run
 1st (juniors), Jeizibärg-Lauf / Valais Mountain Running Championship
 2nd (juniors), Dérupe, Vercorin
 3rd (and 1st juniors ranking), Greifenseelauf, 10 km
 2009:
 1st (F20), Matterhorn run
 1st, Jeizibärg-Lauf / Upper Valais Running Cup / Valais Mountain Running Cup
 2010:
 1st (F20), Matterhorn run
 1st, Jeizibärg-Lauf / Mountain Running Cup
 1st (women I), Hohsaas mountain run
 2011:
 2nd (F20), Matterhorn run
 3rd (women I), Täschalplauf / Upper Valais Running Cup, Täsch

External links 
 Victoria Kreuzer, skimountaineering.org

References 

1989 births
Living people
Swiss female ski mountaineers
Swiss female long-distance runners
Swiss female mountain runners
People from Goms District
Swiss sky runners
Sportspeople from Valais